Al Noor City ("Medinat an-Noor") is a pair of proposed twin cities which would be part of a mega project to link Asia and Africa by building a transcontinental bridge over the Red Sea.  The total investment is expected to reach 200 billion United States dollars over a 15-year period.

A key part of the plan is to connect the two cities with a bridge named the Bridge of the Horns, spanning the southern mouth of the Red Sea. The two planned cities are expected to be built on each end of the Bridge of the Horns. The twin cities will run on renewable energy. On the Djibouti side, President Ismael Omar Guelleh has granted  to build Noor City, the first of the hundreds of Cities of Light the Saudi Binladen Group envisions building. The developers state that they expect Noor City to have 2.5 million residents by 2025, and the Yemeni twin city to have 4.5 million residents, while they envision a new airport serving both cities at a capacity of 100 million passengers annually. A new highway connecting the cities to Dubai is proposed, though there are no plans for roads to connect sparsely populated Djibouti with the population centers of Addis Ababa in Ethiopia or Khartoum in Sudan. The plan is extremely expensive and ambitious, and is sited in a relatively undeveloped area with sparse resources; according to The Economist, "Africans may wonder why the hub is not being built in a bit of Africa where more Africans live and which has food and water."

Timeline 
 July 2009 - Construction of the bridge began 
 June 2010 - Phase I of Yemen and Djibouti Causeway delayed 
 2020 - Planned end of bridge construction

See also
 Bridge of the Horns

References

External links 
 Al Noor Holding Investment
 Al Noor City Project official presentation
 St Tropez in the Horn?

Planned cities
Populated places in Djibouti
Populated places in Yemen
Proposed populated places